Epsilon Minus were a Canadian EBM/techno/trance band formed in 2000 by Bogart Shwadchuck and Jennifer Parkin.  The name "Epsilon Minus" is a reference to Aldous Huxley's novel Brave New World.

History 

Epsilon Minus was started in 2000 by the duo of Bogart Shwadchuck and Jennifer Parkin.  They released their self-titled debut album, Epsilon Minus, with Parkin on vocals, in May 2002 on Belgian record label Alfa Matrix.  They followed in April 2003 with an electronic dance album titled Mark II.  Parkin left the band during the making of Mark II to form Ayria and released Debris on Alfa Matrix.  In an interview with Side-Line, Shwadchuck stated:

Shwadchuck continued Epsilon Minus as a solo act, releasing the Pre-Initialized EP and the Reinitialized LP, exhibiting greater psychedelic trance and intelligence dance influences, in 2004. Reinitialized featured collaborations with Kristy Venrick (The Azoic), Martha M. Arce (Distorted Reality), Eric Oehler (Null Device), and Ned Kirby (Stromkern).  Shwadchuck ended the project in 2005, releasing the short R.I.P. EP of leftovers and outtakes, and continued to record under his own name, as well as under the aliases "Artifice," "Sex Genius," and "Chester Fantastico."  He briefly resurrected Epsilon Minus to perform a remix for The Gothsicles.

Discography 
 Epsilon Minus (Alfa Matrix, 2002)
 Mark II (Alfa Matrix, 2003)
 Pre-Initialized (Alfa Matrix, 2004)
 Reinitialized (Alfa Matrix, 2004)
 20 EP (Self-released, 2022)

References

External links 
 

Canadian techno music groups
Musical groups established in 2000
Musical groups disestablished in 2005